"Pressure" is a song recorded by British techno group Sunscreem, written and produced by band member Paul Carnell and lead singer Lucia Holm for the act's debut album, O3 (1993). Released in 1991, it was the group's first single in the United Kingdom, where it peaked at number 60. It became a major club hit in the United States in wake of the success of "Love U More", where it was released as "Pressure US" with a new remixed version and went to number one on the US Billboard Hot Dance Club Play chart for one week in June 1993, their second of three number ones. The re-released version reentered the UK charts afterwards, peaking at number 19 in 1993.

Critical reception
Upon the release of the 1993 re-release, Larry Flick from Billboard wrote, "British rave band aims to build on radio interest generated by the previous "Love U More" with a tune that blends an anthemic chorus with attitudinal rapping and urgent instrumentation. Cut is an excellent showcase for front woman Lucia Holm's unusual voice and videogenic charm. Already packing dance floors, track is a natural for crossover and top 40 radio. A gem from the potent O3 album." In his weekly UK chart commentary, James Masterton said, "A mellow kind of trance-dance track, for want of a better categorisation and being yet another single off an album that appeals only to specific fans it is unlikely to progress further." 

Andy Beevers from Music Week gave the re-release four out of five and named it Pick of the Week in the category of Dance. He stated that it should make it four hits in a row for the Essex outfit. NME viewed the first release as "a pumping number that will be leaning heavily on the door of the charts. Pianos a-plenty, some dreamy yet ferocious vocals from Lucia Holms and a thundering House tune rumbling along underneath." Tom Doyle from Smash Hits gave the 1993 version three out of five, declaring it as "fine trance-dancing rave stuff", with "a big poppy chorus and an angst-ridden lyric all about being "under pressure" and so forth."

Track listing
 "Pressure" (Original)
"Pressure" – 3:52  
"Pressure" (Release Me Extended) – 6:14  
"Pressure" (12 Inch Mix) – 5:09 

 "Pressure US" (US CD maxi)
"Pressure US" (Fire Island Mix) – 8:27  
"Pressure US" (SXS, remixed by The Wizard Of Oz) – 8:18  
"Pressure US" (Junior Dub) – 6:39  
"Pressure US" (Heaven Mix) – 5:01  
"Pressure US" (Release Me) – 6:13

Charts

Weekly charts

Year-end chart

See also
 List of number-one dance singles of 1993 (U.S.)

References

External links
Original video at YouTube
American video at YouTube

1991 songs
1991 singles
1993 singles
Sunscreem songs
Epic Records singles
Songs written by Lucia Holm
Songs written by Paul Carnell